Mokete Reuben Tsotetsi (born 14 November 1982) is a South African international footballer who plays as a central defender.

Career
Born in Boipatong, Tsotetsi has played for Wits University, FC Sporting, Jomo Cosmos, Kaizer Chiefs, Bloemfontein Celtic, Vasco da Gama, Mpumalanga Black Aces and Roses United.

He earned one cap for South Africa, which came in a FIFA World Cup qualifying match against Sierra Leone on 14 June 2008.

References

1982 births
Living people
South African soccer players
South Africa international soccer players
Association football defenders
Bidvest Wits F.C. players
Jomo Cosmos F.C. players
Kaizer Chiefs F.C. players
Bloemfontein Celtic F.C. players
Vasco da Gama (South Africa) players
Mpumalanga Black Aces F.C. players
Roses United F.C. players